Rodrigo Andrés Gaete Valenzuela (born 21 January 1991) is a Chilean footballer that currently plays for Primera División club Deportes Iquique as a central midfielder.

External links
 Rodrigo Gaete at Football-Lineups
 
 

1991 births
Living people
Chilean footballers
Deportes Iquique footballers
Chilean Primera División players
Association football midfielders
People from Iquique